Manfred Barth (born 31 July 1945) is a German archer. He competed in the men's individual and team events at the 1988 Summer Olympics.

References

External links
 

1945 births
Living people
German male archers
Olympic archers of West Germany
Archers at the 1988 Summer Olympics
Sportspeople from Hamburg